Vanangaan is an upcoming Indian Tamil-language film written and directed by Bala. The film stars Arun Vijay, Roshni Prakash and Mamitha Baiju, while the music is composed by G. V. Prakash Kumar.

Cast 
 Arun Vijay
 Roshni Prakash

Production 
Suriya announced officially on 28 March 2022 that his next film, tentatively titled Suriya 41, would be directed by Bala and produced by himself and Jyothika under 2D Entertainment. On Bala's birthday, Suriya released the first look poster and the title Vanangaan in Tamil and Achaludu in Telugu. This would have been the third collaboration of Suriya and Bala after Nandha and Pithamagan. Suriya was reportedly playing dual roles, one of them deaf and mute. Krithi Shetty was signed on to play the female lead.

Filming was initially planned to be completed entirely in three months; however, work on the film stopped in June due to a reported tiff between the lead actor and director. Following this, Vanangaan was rumored to have been dropped, which Suriya debunked with a social media post in which he stated that he was "waiting to be back on sets". However, on 4 December 2022, Bala announced that Suriya and 2D Entertainment were no longer part of the project due to changes in the film's story. By March 2023, Arun Vijay was confirmed as Suriya's replacement, and Roshni Prakash replaced Shetty.

References

External links 
 

Films directed by Bala (director)
Films scored by G. V. Prakash Kumar
 Upcoming Tamil-language films